George Jeffreys may refer to:

 George Jeffreys (composer) (c. 1610–1685), composer and organist to Charles I
 George Jeffreys, 1st Baron Jeffreys (1645–1689), British politician & jurist 
 George Jeffreys, 1st Baron Jeffreys (British Army officer) (1878–1960), British soldier & politician 
 George Jeffreys (pastor) (1889–1962), British religious leader

See also
 George Jefferies, photographer
 George Jeffery (disambiguation), several people